Henry Patrick Gilmore (17 November 1913 – 1966) was an English professional footballer who played in the Football League for Bournemouth & Boscombe Athletic, Mansfield Town and Queens Park Rangers.

References

1913 births
1966 deaths
English footballers
Association football midfielders
English Football League players
Hull City A.F.C. players
Mansfield Town F.C. players
AFC Bournemouth players
Runcorn F.C. Halton players
Queens Park Rangers F.C. players